"Dindicodes" vigil is a moth of the family Geometridae first described by Louis Beethoven Prout in 1926. It is found in Myanmar.

Taxonomy
The species has a similar wing pattern to that of the species within the crocina group of the genus Dindicodes, but the very different male genitalia, and long, strong, diverging, socii, excludes the species from this genus. For now, the correct generic placement is unknown.

References

Pseudoterpnini
Endemic fauna of Myanmar
Moths described in 1926
Taxa named by Louis Beethoven Prout